General Motors has used the X-platform or X-body designation for two different automobile platforms. All X-bodies were compact car models.

 1962–1979 General Motors X platform (RWD)
 1980–1985 General Motors X platform (FWD)

X